Khmer Republic participated in the 1972 edition of the AFC Asian Cup and won 4th place.

Editions

1972 Asian Cup

Group allocation match

Group B

Semi-finals

Third place play-off

References 

Cambodia national football team
Countries at the AFC Asian Cup